The Men's 400m Individual Medley (or "I.M.") event at the 2005 FINA World Aquatics Championships was swum on 31 July 2005 in Montreal, Quebec, Canada. Preliminary heats were held in the day's morning session, with the top-8 finishers advancing to swim again in the event's final that evening.

Prior to the competition, the existing World (WR) and Championship (CR) records were as follows.
WR: 4:08.26 swum by Michael Phelps (USA) on 14 August 2004 in Athens, Greece.
CR: 4:09.09 swum by Michael Phelps (USA) on 27 July 2003 in Barcelona, Spain

Results

Final

Preliminaries

References
Worlds 2005 results: Men's 400 m individual medley Heats, from OmegaTiming.com (official timer of the 2005 Worlds); Retrieved 2010-02-06.
Worlds 2005 results: Men's 400 m individual medley Finals, from OmegaTiming.com (official timer of the 2005 Worlds); Retrieved 2010-02-06.

Swimming at the 2005 World Aquatics Championships